Torsten Bittermann (born 3 February 1968) is a German football manager and former football player who played as a defender. Bittermann played for Chemnitzer FC and Dynamo Dresden.

References

1968 births
Living people
People from Werdau
East German footballers
German footballers
Association football fullbacks
Chemnitzer FC players
Dynamo Dresden players
2. Bundesliga players
DDR-Oberliga players
Footballers from Saxony